Marc E. Platt (born April 14, 1957) is an American producer who has worked in film, theatre, and television. He has received numerous accolades including two Tony Awards, two Primetime Emmy Awards, as well as nominations for three Academy Awards.

Platt has produced a variety of feature films beginning with the 1987 comedy Campus Man. His films include Legally Blonde (2001), Wanted (2008), Rachel Getting Married (2008), Nine (2009), Scott Pilgrim vs. the World (2010), Drive (2011), The Girl on the Train (2016), and Cruella (2021). He also produced critically acclaimed film such as Steven Spielberg's cold war drama Bridge of Spies (2015), Damien Chazelle's musical La La Land (2016), and Aaron Sorkin legal drama The Trial of the Chicago 7 (2020), all of which earned him Academy Award for Best Picture nominations.

He collaborated with Walt Disney Pictures producing numerous musicals for the studio including Into the Woods (2014), Mary Poppins Returns (2018), Aladdin (2019, as an executive producer), and the upcoming films The Little Mermaid (2023), Snow White (2024), and Universal's Wicked films (2024-2025). In 2021 he produced a film adaptation of the musical Dear Evan Hansen (2021) which featured a leading performance from his son Ben Platt, who originated the title role on Broadway. This casting, however, led to accusations of nepotism against them for having Ben, at age 27, reprise his role in the film. For his work on television he produced Grease Live! (2016), Jesus Christ Superstar Live in Concert (2018), and Rent: Live (2019) as well as the HBO projects Empire Falls (2005), and Oslo (2021).

Platt has produced numerous productions on the Broadway stage with his first official credit being Wicked earning his first Tony Award for Best Musical nomination. He was also nominated for Tony Award for Best Revival of a Musical for Pal Joey in 2009 and Tony Award for Best Play for Indecent in 2017. He won the Tony Award for Best Musical for The Band's Visit in 2018 and the Pulitzer Prize-winning musical A Strange Loop in 2022. He will also produce the upcoming stage adaptation of La La Land.

Early life

Platt was born and raised in a Conservative Jewish home in Pikesville, Maryland, the son of Sue Ellen (née Sezzin), a schoolteacher, and Howard Platt, who worked in the retail shoe business. He has an older brother and a younger sister. He graduated from Pikesville High School in 1975 and the University of Pennsylvania in 1979, where he was a member of the University of Pennsylvania Glee Club. He then earned his Juris Doctor from the New York University School of Law and began his career as an entertainment attorney.

Career
He started producing in theatre, before moving into film. He has served as president of production for three movie studios: Orion Pictures, TriStar Pictures, and Universal Studios. Platt has since formed his own production company, Marc Platt Productions, within the Universal realm and continues to pursue creative projects. His company is responsible for the Legally Blonde films and the HBO miniseries Empire Falls.

He was executive producer of the two-part docudrama The Path to 9/11, shown on ABC on the five-year anniversary of 9/11 on September 10 and 11, 2006. The film was controversial and accused of having a political agenda and fictionalizing the events leading up to the September 11, 2001 attacks, especially those involving the Clinton administration.
 
Platt is also producer of the Broadway hit musical Wicked and its upcoming two-part film adaptation,  and the 2008 Broadway revival of the musical Pal Joey with the Roundabout Theatre Company.

Personal life
Platt and his wife Julie (née Beren) also a Penn graduate and trustee of the university, live in the Los Angeles area. They funded the construction of a performing arts rehearsal and performance space on the campus, the Platt Student Performing Arts House. Platt is a Penn Glee Club alumnus and supporter. His company has taken at least one Penn student intern a year since its inception.

The Platts have five children, including actor and singer Ben Platt and Henry Platt.

Filmography
He was a producer in all films unless otherwise noted.

Film

As an actor

Thanks

Cameo appearances

{| class="wikitable" style="font-size:95%;"
! style="background:#B0C4DE;" | Year
! style="background:#B0C4DE;" | Film
! style="background:#B0C4DE;" | Notes
|-
| 2001 || Inside 'Legally Blonde''' || Documentary
|-
| 2003 || The Hair That Ate Hollywood || Documentary
|-
| 2004 || Wicked: The Road to Broadway || Documentary
|-
| 2007 || ShowBusiness: The Road to Broadway || Documentary
|-
| 2020 || Ben Platt Live from Radio City Music Hall || Concert film
|}

Television

As an actor

Thanks

Cameo appearances

 Theatre 
 1983: Total Abandon (play, associate producer)
 2003–present: Wicked (musical)
 2006: Three Days of Rain (play)
 2008–2009: Pal Joey (musical, associate producer)
 2014: If/Then (musical)
 2016: Oh, Hello on Broadway (Play)
 2017: War Paint (musical)
 2017: Indecent (play)
 2017–2019: The Band's Visit (musical)
 2021–present: A Strange Loop (musical)
 TBA: La La Land'' (musical)

Awards and nominations

References

External links
 
 
 Wicked biography

1957 births
21st-century American Jews
American entertainment industry businesspeople
American film producers
20th-century American lawyers
Entertainment lawyers
Golden Globe Award-winning producers
Jewish American attorneys
New York University School of Law alumni
People from Pikesville, Maryland
Filmmakers who won the Best Film BAFTA Award
Primetime Emmy Award winners
Living people
University of Pennsylvania alumni